Irinympha aglaograpta is a moth in the  family Glyphipterigidae. It is known from Uganda.

References

Endemic fauna of Uganda
Glyphipterigidae
Insects of Uganda
Moths of Africa
Moths described in 1932